Asghar Khodayari (born 9 March 1953) is an Iranian former cyclist. He competed in the individual road race and team time trial events at the 1976 Summer Olympics.

References

External links
 

1953 births
Living people
Iranian male cyclists
Olympic cyclists of Iran
Cyclists at the 1976 Summer Olympics
Place of birth missing (living people)
Cyclists at the 1982 Asian Games
Asian Games competitors for Iran
20th-century Iranian people